Statistics of Swiss Super League in the 1933–34 season.

Overview
It was contested by 16 teams, and Servette FC Genève won the championship.

League standings

Results

Sources 
 Switzerland 1933-34 at RSSSF

Nationalliga seasons
Swiss
1933–34 in Swiss football